The beef top blade steak  (also known as the chicken steak, esp. on the Northeast Coast of the US) comes from the  chuck section of a steer or heifer.

Description

The steaks are cross-cut from the top blade subprimal, also known as Infraspinatus. It is becoming more popular and profitable to abstain from cross cutting the top blade and instead produce flat iron steaks which is cut with the grain and eliminates the connective tissue (fascia) that runs down the middle of this steak.

See also
Beef clod
Flat iron steak

References

Cuts of beef